The hennin (possibly from Flemish  meaning cock or rooster) was a headdress in the shape of a cone, steeple, or truncated cone worn in the Late Middle Ages by European women of the nobility. They were most common in Burgundy and France, but also elsewhere, especially at the English courts, and in Northern Europe, Hungary and Poland. They were little seen in Italy. It is unclear what styles the word hennin described at the time, though it is recorded as being used in French areas in 1428, probably before the conical style appeared. The word does not appear in English until the 19th century.  The term is therefore used by some writers on costume for other female head-dresses of the period.

With many characters or stories in pop culture, the Hennin is the element used to identify princesses of any kind, as well as that of courtesans or any important woman of royalty.

Conical hennins 

These appear from about 1430 onwards, especially after the mid-century, initially only among aristocratic women, though later spreading more widely, especially in the truncated form. Typically, the hennin was approximately between 11" and 18" (30 to 45 cm.) high, but might be considerably higher, as much as over 2'5" (80 cm.). The tops of some of these conical hats were pointed while others were truncated, ending in a flat top. It was generally accompanied by a veil (cointoise) that usually emerged from the top of the cone and was allowed to fall onto the woman's shoulders or even to the ground, or was pulled forward over the hennin, often reaching over the woman's face. The cointoise is the model for the scroll work around a Coat of Arms in Heraldry.

The hennin was worn tilted backward at an angle. It was made of light material, often card or a wire mesh over which a light fabric was fixed, although little is known of the details of their construction. There was often a cloth lappet (cornet) in front of the hennin, covering part of the brow, and sometimes falling onto the shoulders to either side. There is very often a "frontlet" or short loop seen on the forehead (example) to adjust the hennin forward, and perhaps even to hold it on in wind.

It was fashionable to pluck or shave the forehead to raise the hairlines. The hair was tied tightly on the scalp and usually hidden inside the cone (possibly one end of the veil was tied to the hair and wrapped round, with the free end being pulled through the hole at the tip of the cone). However, some images show long hair worn loose behind the hennin.

Nowadays, the hennin forms part of the depiction of the stereotypical fairy-tale princess. There are some manuscript illuminations that show princesses or queens wearing small crowns either round the brim or at the top of the hennin; it is likely that the very small crown of Margaret of York, Duchess of Burgundy (now in the treasury of Aachen Cathedral) was worn like this for her famously lavish wedding celebrations in 1468.

Definition 
Various writers on costume history use hennin to cover a variety of different styles. Almost all agree that the steeple-cone style was a hennin, and the truncated ("flowerpot") versions. Many also include the heart-shaped open-centred escoffion. Some also use the term to cover beehive-shaped fabric head-coverings of the mid-century (example). Others also use it for the head-dresses divided to right and left of the early part of the century, such as those in which Christine de Pisan is usually depicted (example). In some of these only white cloth is visible, but in later examples worn by aristocrats rich fabric can be seen through translucent veils. Some use it for the horned hairstyle with a wimple on top.

The Chronique of Enguerrand de Monstrelet records that in 1428, in what seems to be the first record of the term "hennin", the radical Carmelite friar Thomas Conecte railed against extravagant headdresses of...
...the noble ladies, and all others, who dressed their heads in so ridiculous a manner, and who spent such large sums on such luxuries of fashion.

Thomas urged street boys to chase after such ladies and pluck off their headdresses, crying "Au hennin!", even granting indulgences to those who did so, although as so often in medieval documentary records, no clue as to the form of the "hennins" is given. Based on the evidence from visual records, they were probably not conical head-dresses, which are first seen slightly later. The Catalan poet Gabriel Mòger mocked the "tall deformed hat" that was popular with Majorcan women of the time.

Gallery

See also 
1400–1500 in fashion
Tantur
Capuchon
Pointed hat

Notes

References 
 Boucher, François: 20,000 Years of Fashion, Harry Abrams, 1966.
 Kohler, Carl: A History of Costume, Dover Publications reprint, 1963, 
 Laver, James: The Concise History of Costume and Fashion, Abrams, 1979
 Payne, Blanche: History of Costume from the Ancient Egyptians to the Twentieth Century, Harper & Row, 1965. No ISBN for this edition; ASIN B0006BMNFS
Françoise Piponnier and Perrine Mane; Dress in the Middle Ages; Yale UP, 1997;  
 Vibbert, Marie, Headdresses of the 14th and 15th Centuries, The Compleat Anachronist, No. 133, SCA monograph series (August 2006)

External links 

 Images of Burgundian conical hennins
 Constructing the Headdresses of the Fourteenth and Fifteenth Centuries, paper by Marie Vibbert (Lyonnete Vibert), Known World Costume Symposium Proceedings (2005).
  Coiffures féminines — Le Hennin
 Burgundian wedding c.1470, from the Getty, with a great variety of head-dresses.

15th-century fashion
16th-century fashion
Costume design
Pointed hats
History of clothing (Western fashion)
Medieval European costume
Women's clothing